The following turnpikes were chartered and built in Rhode Island:
 West Glocester Turnpike 1794
 Providence and Norwich Turnpike 1794
 Rhode Island and Connecticut Turnpike 1803
 Glocester Turnpike 1804
 Providence and Douglass Turnpike 1805
 Rhode Island Turnpike 1805
 Loisquisset Turnpike 1806
 Providence and Pawtucket Turnpike 1807
 Farnum and Providence Turnpike 1808
 Woonasquatucket Turnpike 1810
 Powder Mill Turnpike 1810
 Natick Turnpike 1812
 Valley Falls Turnpike 1813
 Foster and Scituate Turnpike 1813
 Foster and Scituate Central Turnpike 1813
 Coventry and Cranston Turnpike
 Providence and Pawcatuck Turnpike 1816
 Hopkinton and Richmond Turnpike 1820
 Smithfield Turnpike 1823
 Pawtuxet Turnpike 1825
 Mineral Spring Turnpike 1825
 Pawtucket and Providence East Turnpike 1825
 Fall River and Watupper Turnpike 1827 (became within Massachusetts after a border change in 1861)
 Stone Bridge and Fall River Turnpike 1838

Current turnpikes
There is only one turnpike in Rhode Island currently:
New London Turnpike

References
 
 

Turnpikes
 Rhode Island